The 2003 Miami Hurricanes football team represented the University of Miami during the 2003 NCAA Division I-A football season. It was the Hurricanes' 78th season of football and 13th as a member of the Big East Conference. The Hurricanes were led by third-year head coach Larry Coker and played their home games at the Orange Bowl. They finished the season 11–2 overall and 6–1 in the Big East to finish as conference co-champion. They were invited to the Orange Bowl where they defeated Florida State, 16–14.

Schedule

Miami's 500th victory in school history came against West Virginia on October 2, 2003.

Roster

Game summaries

Florida

Florida State

References

Miami
Miami Hurricanes football seasons
Orange Bowl champion seasons
Lambert-Meadowlands Trophy seasons
Miami Hurricanes football